Baquedano is a transfer station between the Line 1 and Line 5 of the Santiago Metro. It is located close to the eastern terminus of the Avenida Libertador General Bernardo O'Higgins. The station was initially a single-line station on the Line 1, later was enlarged since the Line 5's opening date. there are plans for the future line 7 to intersect with this station.

The Line 1 station was opened on 31 March 1977 as part of the extension of the line from La Moneda to Salvador. The Line 5 station was opened on 5 April 1997 as the northern terminus of the inaugural section of the line, from Baquedano to Bellavista de La Florida. On 3 March 2000, the line was extended to Santa Ana.

References

Santiago Metro stations
Railway stations opened in 1977
1977 establishments in Chile
Santiago Metro Line 1
Santiago Metro Line 5